Secrets & Lies  is an Australian drama television series that first screened on Network Ten on 3 March 2014.

The series has aired in the Republic of Ireland on RTÉ TWO HD from 30 March 2014 at 9.30pm. The series also debuted in Canada on the CBC in July 2014. It premiered in the Netherlands on RTL 4 on 24 August 2014. Started in the UK on 23 September 2014 on Channel 5 and in France from 26 January to 2 February 2015 on France2. It has additionally aired on SVT (Sweden), TV2 (Norway), Vitaya (Belgium), as well as Netflix in both Canada and the U.S.

Plot
The series follows the story of a family man who finds the body of a young boy and quickly becomes the prime suspect in his murder. Not content to let the police do their work, and becoming increasingly frustrated at being questioned repeatedly, he decides to try to find the real killer as his marriage, his kids, his reputation, and his sanity are all at stake; a decision exacerbates his life.

Cast

Main
Martin Henderson as Ben Gundelach
Anthony Hayes as Detective Ian Cornielle
Diana Glenn as Christy Gundelach
Adrienne Pickering as Jess Murnane
Philippa Coulthard as Tasha Gundelach
Piper Morrissey as Eva Gundelach
Damon Gameau as Dave Carroll
Hunter Stratton Boland as Thom Murnane

Recurring and guest
Mouche Phillips as Vanessa Turner
Damien Garvey as Stuart Haire
Steven Tandy as Kevin Gresham
Barbara Lowing as Elaine Gresham
Hugh Parker as Dr Tim Turner
Ben Lawson as Paul Murnane
Mirrah Foulkes as Nicole

Episodes

Reception
Secrets and Lies has been acclaimed by critics and audiences. Denette Wilford of The Huffington Post has stated: "As for Secrets & Lies, so much great stuff is happening on this show – the writing, the directing and the acting; it manages to be completely authentic without trying too hard. It's riveting stuff, from the whodunit aspect to the family crap the Gundelachs are facing, which everyone can relate to." Lucy Mangan from The Guardian wrote in a review of the series; "Yes, we have seen its like before, in Broadchurch, but the opener more than holds its own against ITV's surprise hit." Many other critics have praised the performances, writing and direction of the series.

Awards and nominations

U.S. version
On 4 February 2014, the production company behind this version announced that a US version with the same title was in the works for ABC and would be co-produced with ABC Studios with a series penalty if the project is held back or not greenlighted by the network. The series premiered in the U.S. on 1 March 2015. Ryan Phillippe stars in this adaptation. On May 7, 2015, the series was renewed for a second season which was later premiered on September 25, 2016.

References

External links

Network 10 original programming
Australian drama television series
Serial drama television series
2014 Australian television series debuts
2014 Australian television series endings
Television shows set in Brisbane
English-language television shows